Hubert Lucot (1935 – 18 January 2017) was a French poet and metafiction writer. The son of director , he was the author of over 60 books.

Biography 
Hubert Lucot was born in 1935 in Paris.

Lucot began his career as a poet. In the 1960s, he took up prose, especially metafiction. Over the course of his career, he published over 60 books.

Works 

1971: Le Grand Graphe
1975: Autobiogre d'A.M. 75
1981: Phanée les nuées
1984: Langst
1995: Sur le motif
1998: Les Voleurs d'orgasmes
1999: Probablement
2001: Frasques
2003:Opérations
2005:Opérateur le néant
2006:Le Centre de la France
2007:Grands mots d'ordre et petites phrases pour gagner la présidentielle
2008: Recadrages
2009: Allégement
2010: Le Noyau de toute chose
2011:Overdose
2013:Je vais, je vis
2016: La Conscience
2022: À mon tour

Publications 

1969: Information, suivi de ET, Fragment 1
1969: Bram moi Haas, Agnès Gei éditions
1972: Opéra pour un graphe, music by Marcel Goldmann, France Culture
1976: Overdose, roman, Orange Export Ltd
1979: Mê, Orange Export Ltd
1980: Le Dit des lacs, Orange Export Ltd
1980: Autobiogre d’A.M. 75, Hachette/P.O.L
1981: Phanées les nuées, Hachette/P.O.L
1985: Mêlangst, cassette, Artalect
1986: Travail du temps, Carte blanche
1987: Bram et le Néant, La Sétérée
1990: Simulation, Imprimerie nationale
1970–1971: Le Grand Graphe, 12,2 m original version accompagnée du Graphe par lui-même, version linéaire, Tristram, 1990
1990: Le Gato noir, Tristram
1990: Dépositions, Colorature
1993, 1994, 1995: Les Affiches, n°8, n°11, n°14, n°52}, Le Bleu du ciel
1993: jac Regrouper (1966-1968), Carte blanche
1994: Bram ou Seule la Peinture, Maeght éd.
1996: Absolument (1961-1965), La Sétérée
1997: D’Absolument à Sur le motif, Horlieu
1999: Information (1969-1970), Aleph
1999: L'Être Julie, L'Ordalie
1999: Frasque, La Sétérée
2000: Pour plus de liberté encore, Voix
2001: Subventionnons l'humanitaire, Contre-Pied
2004: Dans l'enfer des profondeurs, Éditions de l'Attente
2004: Requiem pour un loden, Passage d'encres
2004: Crin (1959-1961), Éditions Pierre Mainard
2006: Le Noir et le Bleu, 
2006: Petits mots d'ordre et phrases incorrectes, Contre-Pied
2009: L'Encrassement, Voix
2009: Album de guerre, sur des images de Pierre Buraglio, La Sétérée
2010: Odette, Hapax

Bibliography 
 , "Les tensions d’Hubert Lucot : saisir, lancer, illuminer", @nalyses, vol. 5, n°2, spring 2010, .

References

External links 
 Overdose d'Hubert Lucot par Jacques Barbaut
 Hubert Lucot chez Autres et Pareils
 Mort de l’écrivain atypique Hubert Lucot on LivresHebdo (19 January 2017)
 Hubert Lucot dans l’éternité et dans l’autobus in Le Monde (29 December 2016)
 La Conscience, Hubert Lucot on Éditions P.O.L
 Hubert Lucot - Je vais, je vis on YouTube

1935 births
2017 deaths
Writers from Paris
20th-century French poets
21st-century French poets
21st-century French male writers
French male poets
20th-century French male writers